The 1969 Piccadilly World Match Play Championship was the sixth World Match Play Championship. It was played from Thursday 9 to Saturday 11 October on the West Course at Wentworth. Eight players competed in a straight knock-out competition, with each match contested over 36 holes. The champion received £5,750 out of a total prize fund of £18,400. In the final, Bob Charles beat Gene Littler with an eagle at the 37th hole.

For the first time all tickets had to be bought in advance. Tickets cost £2 and were restricted to 8,000 on the first day, 5,000 on the second and 3,000 for the final.

The tournament that had, in previous years, been played on the East Course immediately before the World Match Play Championship was replaced by the Piccadilly Medal played at Prince's Golf Club from 16 to 19 July. 64 players competed in the knock-out stroke play competition with early rounds being over 18 holes and a 36-hole final. The winner was Peter Alliss who won £1,500.

Course
Source:

Scores
Source:

Prize money
Prize money was increased by 15% for previous years with the winner receiving £5,750 out of a total prize fund of £18,400.

References

Volvo World Match Play Championship
Golf tournaments in England
Piccadilly World Match Play Championship
Piccadilly World Match Play Championship
October 1969 sports events in the United Kingdom